Olivia Bergström (born 24 April 1996) is a Swedish sailor. She competed in the women's 470 event at the 2020 Summer Olympics.

References

External links
 

1996 births
Living people
Swedish female sailors (sport)
Olympic sailors of Sweden
Sailors at the 2020 Summer Olympics – 470
Place of birth missing (living people)